Uche Odoh  (born 20 August 1989) is a Nigerian female photographer, content creator, filmmaker and model who became popular by joining the 2007 edition of the Amstel Malta Box Office Competition.

Early life
Odoh was born in Enugu State in the South-Eastern part of Nigeria, on 30 August 1989. She studied Agronomy at the Enugu State University of Science and Technology.

Career
Odoh's foray into entertainment began with her participation in the 2007 edition of the Amstel Malta Box Office Competition. She then began her career as a model before turning to photography.

She has featured in a number of Nigerian artists' videos, including Wizkid's "Hola at your boy" and Bracket's  "Remember (Yori Yori Remix)". Odoh involves herself in other activities, including event planning, and she also runs a small-scale production company Eastside Productions as well as an online TV channel, Gosi TV.  In 2011, she attended a short film course with Del-York International, facilitated by the New York Film Academy, after which she obtained a Diploma in Film Production at the Vancouver Film School in 2015.

She went on to work with Empire Mates Entertainment (EME) and later the CMA Group. In 2016 she directed the short film for Homevida Org, titled In Apathy, which went on to win the Homevida short film category at the Homevida 2016 awards. She has worked on the set of a number of notable Nigerian box office movies, including the hugely successful King of Boys and Up North, to name a few. Odoh also released her first solo major project in 2019, a web series titled Life As It Is.

Filmography

Director
Life As It Is – TV Series  (2019)
Bless Me – Music Video (2019) 
Without You – Short Film (2016)

First Assistant Director
King of Boys - Feature Film (2018)
Up North - Feature Film (2018)
Code Wilo – Feature Film (2018)
Evol – Feature film (2017)
Guinness Goodluck Obiyese - TVC (2017)

Unit Production Manager
Hakkunde – Feature film (2017)

Production Manager
We Don’t live here anymore - Feature Film (2017)

Producer
Life As It Is – TV series (2019)
Without You – Short Film (2016) 
Concrete Jungle – Short Film

Line Producer
Ever After – Feature Film

Visuals by Uche or Self (11 credits)
A Day In The Life: Babies, Bae, Band & Banky W – (2017)
Dustbin Estate: Lagos – Short Film/ Documentary  (2016)
GTBank Fashion Weekend – (2016) 
Elanred Holiday Ad campaign (2015)
Maryland Mall Promo  (2016) 
Waxing with Ehiz and Jimmie – (2019)
The First Wave: Ycee – Documentary  (2017)
JAXX BTS Campaign shoot (2017) 
Access Bank W Awards Promo  (2016)
Bauchi Diaries (Week 1, 2, 3) Vlog (2018)
Tour Diaries with Timaya: Easter Weekend, Kenya & Enugu (2017/2018)

See also
 List of Nigerian film producers

References

Living people
Nigerian filmmakers
1989 births
Nigerian photographers
Nigerian media personalities
Nigerian female models
Nigerian television personalities
Enugu State University of Science and Technology alumni
Participants in Nigerian reality television series
Nigerian Internet celebrities
Igbo people
People from Enugu State